Stream ciphers, where plaintext bits are combined with a cipher bit stream by an exclusive-or operation (xor), can be very secure if used properly. However, they are vulnerable to attacks if certain precautions are not followed:

keys must never be used twice
valid decryption should never be relied on to indicate authenticity

Reused key attack
Stream ciphers are vulnerable to attack if the same key is used twice (depth of two) or more.

Say we send messages A and B of the same length, both encrypted using same key, K.  The stream cipher produces a string of bits C(K) the same length as the messages.  The encrypted versions of the messages then are:

E(A) = A xor C
E(B) = B xor C

where xor is performed bit by bit.

Say an adversary has intercepted E(A) and E(B).  He can easily compute:

E(A) xor E(B)

However, xor is commutative and has the property that X xor X = 0  (self-inverse) so:
E(A) xor E(B) = (A xor C) xor (B xor C) = A xor B xor C xor C = A xor B

If one message is longer than the other, our adversary just truncates the longer message to the size of the shorter and his attack will only reveal that portion of the longer message.  In other words, if anyone intercepts two messages encrypted with the same key, they can recover A xor B, which is a form of running key cipher.  Even if neither message is known, as long as both messages are in a natural language, such a cipher can often be broken by paper-and-pencil methods.  During World War II, British cryptanalyst John Tiltman accomplished this with the Lorenz cipher (dubbed "Tunny"). With an average personal computer, such ciphers can usually be broken in a matter of minutes.  If one message is known, the solution is trivial.

Another situation where recovery is trivial is if traffic-flow security measures have each station sending a continuous stream of cipher bits, with null characters (e.g. LTRS in Baudot) being sent when there is no real traffic. This is common in military communications. In that case, and if the transmission channel is not fully loaded, there is a good likelihood that one of the ciphertext streams will be just nulls. The NSA goes to great lengths to prevent keys from being used twice. 1960s-era encryption systems often included a punched card reader for loading keys. The mechanism would automatically cut the card in half when the card was removed, preventing its reuse.

One way to avoid this problem is to use an initialization vector (IV), sent in the clear, that is combined with a secret master key to create a one-time key for the stream cipher. This is done in several common systems that use the popular stream cipher RC4, including Wired Equivalent Privacy (WEP), Wi-Fi Protected Access (WPA) and Ciphersaber. One of the many problems with WEP was that its IV was too short, 24 bits. This meant that there was a high likelihood that the same IV would be used twice if more than a few thousand packets were sent with the same master key (see birthday attack), subjecting the packets with duplicated IV to the key reuse attack. This problem was fixed in WPA by changing the "master" key frequently.

Bit-flipping attack

Suppose an adversary knows the exact content of all or part of one of our messages. As a part of a man in the middle attack or replay attack, he can alter the content of the message without knowing the key, K. Say, for example, he knows a portion of the message, say an electronics fund transfer, contains the ASCII string "$1000.00". He can change that to "$9500.00" by XORing that portion of the ciphertext with the string: "$1000.00" xor "$9500.00".  To see how this works, consider that the cipher text we send is just C(K) xor "$1000.00". The new message the adversary is creating is:

(C(K) xor "$1000.00") xor ("$1000.00" xor "$9500.00") = C(K) xor "$1000.00" xor "$1000.00" xor "$9500.00" =  C(K) xor "$9500.00"

Recall that a string XORed with itself produces all zeros and that a string of zeros XORed with another string leaves that string intact. The result, C(K) xor "$9500.00", is what our ciphertext would have been if $9500 were the correct amount.

Bit-flipping attacks can be prevented by including message authentication code to increase the likelihood that tampering will be detected.

Chosen-IV attack

Stream ciphers combine a secret key with an agreed initialization vector (IV) to produce a pseudo-random sequence which from time-to-time is re-synchronized.  A "Chosen IV" attack relies on finding particular IV's which taken together probably will reveal information about the secret key.  Typically multiple pairs of IV are chosen and differences in generated key-streams are then analysed statistically for a linear correlation and/or an algebraic boolean relation (see also Differential cryptanalysis).  If choosing particular values of the initialization vector does expose a non-random pattern in the generated sequence, then this attack computes some bits and thus shortens the effective key length.  A symptom of the attack would be frequent re-synchronisation.  Modern stream ciphers include steps to adequately mix the secret key with an initialization vector, usually by performing many initial rounds.

References

External links
 Security of the WEP algorithm
 "Attacks in Stream Ciphers: A Survey" – a brief 2014 overview of different stream cipher attacks
 "Attacks on Stream Ciphers: A Perspective" – talk slides from 2011

Cryptographic attacks